Eli Wathne (born 26 September 1970) is a Norwegian politician from the Conservative Party.

She served as a deputy representative to the Parliament of Norway from Hedmark during the term 2017–2021. Hailing from Kongsvinger, she is a board member of Kongsvinger IL Toppfotball.

References

1970 births
Living people
Politicians from Kongsvinger
Deputy members of the Storting
Conservative Party (Norway) politicians
Hedmark politicians
Norwegian women in politics
Norwegian sports executives and administrators
Women members of the Storting